The men's 200 metre butterfly event at the 1968 Olympic Games took place 24 October. This swimming event used the butterfly stroke. Because an Olympic-size swimming pool is 50 metres long, this race consisted of four lengths of the pool.

Medalists

Results

Heats
Heat 1

Heat 2

Heat 3

Heat 4

Heat 5

Final

References

Men's butterfly 200 metre
Men's events at the 1968 Summer Olympics